A hot streak is a term used to describe a streak of repeated success, such as a winning streak, or a hitting streak. It may also refer to the following:
Hot streak may also refer to:

Hot Streak, an Australian game show
Hot-Streak a.k.a. Hotstreak, a fictional character from the animated superhero TV series, Static Shock
Hot Streak (album), a 2015 music album by American rock band, The Winery Dogs
Hot Streak (Hit the Floor), an episode from the 4th season of the American TV drama, Hit the Floor

See also
Cold streak